The Journal of the Early Republic is a quarterly peer-reviewed academic journal which focuses on the early culture and history of the United States from 1776–1861. The journal is published by the University of Pennsylvania Press on behalf of the Society for Historians of the Early American Republic. The first issue published, Vol. 1, No. 1, was released in 1981. As of date, the current editors-in-chief are Andrew Shankman and Johann Neem.

References

 

History of the United States journals
Quarterly journals
English-language journals
Publications established in 1980
University of Pennsylvania Press academic journals
Academic journals associated with learned and professional societies